The 1980 Minnesota Senate election was held in the U.S. state of Minnesota on November 4, 1980, to elect members to the Senate of the 72nd Minnesota Legislature. A primary election was held on September 9, 1980.

The Minnesota Democratic–Farmer–Labor Party (DFL) won a majority of seats, remaining the majority party, followed by the Independent-Republicans of Minnesota. The new Legislature convened on January 6, 1981.

Results

See also
 Minnesota House of Representatives election, 1980
 Minnesota gubernatorial election, 1978

References

1980 Minnesota elections
Minnesota Senate elections
Minnesota